Siti Aminah binti Aching is a Malaysian politician who has served as the Deputy Minister of Plantation and Commodities in the Pakatan Harapan (PH) administration under Prime Minister Anwar Ibrahim since December 2022 and the Member of Parliament (MP) for Beaufort since November 2022. She is a member of the United Malays National Organisation (UMNO), a component party of the BN coalition.

Election results

Honours 
 :
  Commander of the Order of Kinabalu (PGDK) – Datuk (2020)

References 

Living people
People from Sabah
Malaysian Muslims
United Malays National Organisation politicians
Members of the Dewan Rakyat
Women members of the Dewan Rakyat
Women in Sabah politics
21st-century Malaysian politicians
21st-century Malaysian women politicians
Year of birth missing (living people)